Edward Plane (27 September 1907 – 1969) was an English footballer who played as a goalkeeper for Rochdale. He also played non-league football for various other clubs.

References

Rochdale A.F.C. players
Bacup Borough F.C. players
Winsford United F.C. players
People from the Borough of Rossendale
English footballers
1907 births
1969 deaths
Association footballers not categorized by position